Schweineherbst ("Pigs Fall") is the fifth studio-album by German punk rock band Slime. In it, they again criticise the politics of Germany.

Track listing 

 Schweineherbst (Pigs fall)
 Stillstand (Standstill)
 Zweifel (Doubt)
 Feuer (Fire)
 Hoffnung (Hope)
 Zusammen (Together)
 Gewalt (Violence)
 Der Tod ist ein Meister aus Deutschland (Death is a Master from Germany)
 Ich war dabei (I was present)
 Brüllen, zertrümmern und weg (Yelling, crashing and away)
 Die Leere (The emptiness)
 Joe ist zurück (Joe is back)
 Aufrecht gehen (Going uprightly)
 Genug (Enough)
 Goldene Türme (Golden Towers)

1994 albums
Slime (band) albums